The 1982 African Cup of Champions Clubs was the 18th edition of the annual international club football competition held in the CAF region (Africa), the African Cup of Champions Clubs. It determined that year's club champion of association football in Africa.

The tournament was played by 36 teams and was used a playoff scheme with home and away matches. Al Ahly SC from Egypt won that final, and became for the first time CAF club champion.

Preliminary round

|}

First round

|}
1

Second round

|}

Quarter-finals

|}

Semi-finals

|}

Final

Champion

Top scorers
The top scorers from the 1982 African Cup of Champions Clubs are as follows:

References
RSSSF.com

1
African Cup of Champions Clubs